Vlaamse Vervoersmaatschappij De Lijn (English: Flemish transport company De Lijn), usually known as De Lijn ("The Line"), is a company run by the Flemish government in Belgium to provide public transportation with about 2240 buses and 399 trams. De Lijn was founded in 1991 after the public transportation companies of Antwerp and Ghent fused with the Flemish part of the NMVB (Nationale Maatschappij van Buurtspoorwegen, or the "National Company of Neighborhood Railways").

Socialist politician Steve Stevaert of Hasselt implemented a policy allowing registered residents in Flanders aged 65+ to ride anywhere in Flanders free. This has since been changed into allowing 65+ inhabitants to purchase cheap year passes which are valid throughout de Lijn. For around 52 euros, senior citizens can now travel freely as often as they wish. Other incentives exist for people under age 25. De Lijn is being viewed as an integral part to reduce heavily congested traffic, together with the NMBS (Belgium's national rail operator).

In 2016, it transported more than 518.8 million passengers in an area with a population of approximately 6.5 million.

De Lijn operates:
 Antwerp Tramway, with both street running and underground light rail (Antwerp Pre-metro).
 Ghent Tramway, mostly street running with some reserved track.
 Coast tram, an interurban line along the whole Belgian coast, between De Panne and Knokke.
 All urban, suburban and intercity buses in Flanders. Because of the dense rail network, intercity buses serve as local transport between big cities and smaller communities. Time to travel from one city to another by bus is most often longer than for the same journey on the train because bus lines are less straight, as they pass through many small towns that are not served by railway. The buses are  more city-style (no coach buses are used). In the Limburg province with few railways, buses are the main mode of intercity travel. There are also express intercity buses there.

The fares are the same on all modes.

De Lijn issues a smartcard called the Lijnkaart and a chain of shops called Lijnwinkel.

De Lijn also supports the Flemish Tram and Bus Museum, located in Antwerp and connected to the tracks of the Antwerp Tramway.

See also

TEC - equivalent company in Wallonia
MIVB-STIB - equivalent company in Brussels

References

External links

Official website (in Dutch)

Public transport operators
Companies based in Antwerp Province
Public transport in Belgium
Mechelen
1991 establishments in Belgium
Transport companies established in 1991
Government-owned companies of Belgium